Thomas Merlyn is a fictional supervillain appearing in comic books published by DC Comics related to Green Arrow. Created by Judd Winick and Freddie E. Williams II, he is the son of Arthur King / Malcolm Merlyn / Dark Archer.

Colin Donnell portrayed the character in the Arrowverse television series Arrow.

Publication history
Tommy Merlyn made his debut in Green Arrow Vol. 5 #0 (September 2012), as part of "The New 52" reboot while coinciding with the then-recently debuted television series Arrow a month later.

Fictional character biography
Tommy Merlyn is introduced as the son of Merlyn (Arthur King). Tommy is best friends with billionaire playboy Oliver Queen. When Oliver's father had relegated him to clerical work on an oil rig on the Pacific Ocean, he turned the rig into a hub for wild parties. At one such party, Oliver had decided to demonstrate archery to Leena and Tommy. The group of friends were awaiting on a rock star hired by Oliver to play for them. Things got much worse when the helicopter meant to be carrying this rock star turned out to have been commandeered by oil-thieving terrorists. Tommy dragged Ollie to safety, leaving Leena outside on the platform. The two of them discovered a wounded crewman who blamed Oliver for the security breach, as the terrorists commandeered one of the helicopters that was not even supposed to have been there. These terrorists had fixed the platform and several of its occupants including Leena with explosives, holding them hostage until they could siphon millions of dollars worth of crude oil.

Tommy and Oliver managed to get past some sentries, and despite his warnings, Oliver went up onto the platform alone, armed with only a longbow, in the hopes of saving Leena. Oliver had a plan: to take just one shot, through the terrorist leader's wrist, causing him to drop the detonator into the ocean. Unfortunately, on its way down, the detonator bounced against one of the platform's struts, and activated. Leena and everyone around her were obliterated by the explosion. Before Oliver could be caught in the explosion, Tommy leapt out, and thrust them both into the safety of the ocean. Badly burnt, Tommy warned that these would not be the only people that Oliver's recklessness would get killed, before passing out. One year later, a monastery on a pacific island has been caring for a badly burnt coma patient for years. Suddenly, Tommy wakes up.

He is next seen in the 2014 Green Arrow storyline "Kingdom", in which he appears as the heavily burned Dark Archer. Killing Mack Morgan before he could give critical intelligence to destroy the reputation of his employer, John King. King, a billionaire hired Merlyn with bringing Mia Dearden to him. Thanks to John Diggle's skillful driving, Oliver manages to catch up to Merlyn on top of a monorail train, where he learns that Tommy is nearly a match for him with a bow. When Tommy attempts to attack him at close range, though, he recognizes his opponent as his old friend just as they pass under a tunnel. When Oliver recovers from the quick duck, Tommy is gone. Fortunately, he left Mia behind.

Powers and abilities
As his father has been established as one of the greatest and most accurate archers in the DC Universe, Tommy Merlyn's archery and marksmanship skills can be compared to those of Green Arrow, Roy Harper and Connor Hawke.

In other media
Numerous characters based on Tommy Merlyn appear in media set in the Arrowverse, all portrayed by Colin Donnell as an adult and Arien Boey as a child.
 The primary Earth-1 incarnation appears as a main character in the first season of Arrow as the childhood best friend of Oliver Queen, the paternal half-brother of Thea Queen, and the son of Malcolm Merlyn. A spoiled playboy who lives off Malcolm's financial support, Tommy dates Laurel Lance until Malcolm cuts off him off. Despite this, Tommy starts the Verdant nightclub along with Oliver, though their friendship becomes strained when Tommy learns that Oliver is the murderous vigilante, the Hood, and he breaks up with Laurel, believing the latter is still in love with Oliver. Amidst Malcolm's "Undertaking", Tommy is fatally injured while saving Laurel from a collapsing building and makes amends with Oliver before he dies. Tommy appears in subsequent seasons as hallucinations and in flashbacks. In the sixth season, Christopher Chance uses Tommy's likeness to make Star City's citizens believe Tommy is alive as the Green Arrow.
 An Earth-X doppelganger of Tommy who became "Prometheus" appears in the crossover "Crisis on Earth-X". A partner and friend of the Führer, the Dark Arrow, this version is an enforcer for the New Reichsmen. Tommy joins the Dark Arrow's invasion of Earth-1, but is defeated and captured by Sara Lance and Alex Danvers. Earth-1 Oliver interrogates Tommy and offers him redemption, but the latter scoffs at the notion and takes a suicide pill out of loyalty to the Dark Arrow and to spite Earth-1's heroes.
 An Earth-2 doppelganger who became the Dark Archer appears in Arrows eighth season premiere "Starling City". Upset over Thea's death by Vertigo overdose, he seeks to destroy Star City with his own version of the Undertaking. However, Earth-1 Oliver defeats him and talks Tommy out of it. Tommy is later vaporized by anti-matter during Earth-2's destruction.
 An Earth-Prime doppelganger who was married to Laurel appears in Arrows series finale "Fadeout". Following Laurel's death in the fourth season and the events of the crossover "Crisis on Infinite Earths", Tommy gains a form of closure after meeting Earth-2 Laurel Lance during Oliver's funeral.

Notes

References

External links
 Thomas Merlyn at the DC Database
 

DC Comics supervillains
Comics characters introduced in 2012
DC Comics television characters
Fictional archers
Fictional characters with disfigurements
Fictional swordfighters in comics
Characters created by Judd Winick
Fictional businesspeople